Jean-Claude Brisville (28 May 1922 – 11 August 2014) was a French writer, playwright, novelist and author for children. A screenwriter, in particular for the film Beaumarchais, l'insolent, he obtained the Grand Prix du théâtre of the Académie française in 1989 for all his body of work.

It was the film adaptation that Édouard Molinaro realized in 1992, Claude Brasseur taking the role of Fouché and Claude Rich that of Talleyrand, which made him discover by the general public.

Biography 
An esteemed but confidential poet, playwright and essayist, he worked for the Hachette publishing house then became a reader for the Éditions Julliard. In 1957, he wrote and published the first study about Albert Camus who made him his last secretary until 1959. The family responsibilities made him renounce the risky profession of playwright and devote himself entirely to that of publisher. In 1964, after he became a literary director, he made Ernst Jünger known in France by publishing a new edition of the "Journal de guerre", thanks to the determination of 

In 1970, he established a lasting friendship with Julien Gracq who accepted the adaptation he wrote for the television production that Jean-Christophe Averty did of the Beau Ténébreux.

In 1976, he was appointed director of Le Livre de Poche. His dismissal in 1981 at the age of sixty, made him reconnect with his pen and settle his accounts with the medium of publishing in the form of a satirical piece, Le Fauteuil à bascule where an editor is opposed to an avid boss. The success of the play at the Petit Odéon and the  led him, after several failures with other creations, to resume the process of dialogue between two characters, each incarnating a cause opposite to the other, Descartes and Blaise Pascal for reason and faith, the marquise du Deffand and Julie de Lespinasse for the old and the modern, Talleyrand and Fouché for political genius and arrivism, Napoléon and Hudson Lowe for tragic destiny and honest pettiness. It is in L'Antichambre that he expressed all his melancholy for a French language in the process of disappearance.

In 1984, he approached René Char, a brother in writing of Albert Camus. Starting in 1997, he began a work of "anamnesis" "Not to be alien to oneself" which he published, faithful to existentialism, in the form of fragments of the past which related less to his person than to their times, memories mixed with aphorisms with pessimistic humor.

Jean-Claude Brisville was a Chevalier of the Légion d'honneur and Officier of the Ordre des Arts et des Lettres.

Works

Theatre 
1946: Les Emmurés, three-act play, directed by Émile Dars, Théâtre du Vieux-Colombier
1955: Saint-Just
1972: Le Rôdeur - Nora - Le Récital, three 1-act plays with 3 characters (1970)
1982: Le Fauteuil à bascule
1983: Le Bonheur à Romorantin
1985: L'Entretien de M. Descartes avec M. Pascal le jeune 
1986: La Villa bleue
1989: Le Souper
1991: L'Antichambre
1993: Contre-jour
1995: La Dernière Salve
2007: Sept comédies en quête d'acteurs

Essays 
1948: Prologue
1954: La Présence réelle
1959: Camus, la Bibliothèque idéale, NRF Éditions Gallimard
1998: De mémoire (Souvenirs)
2006: Quartiers d'hiver (Souvenirs)
2009: Rien n'est jamais fini (Souvenirs)

Novels 
1954: D'un amour, Prix Sainte-Beuve
1962: La Fuite au Danemark
1972: La Petite Marie, published by Gallimard, under the pseudonym Sylvain Saulnier) 
1976: La zone d'ombre
1982: La Révélation d'une voix et d'un nom
2002: Vive Henri IV

Tales 
1975: Les Trèfle de Longue-Oreille. Première aventure : Petit Trèfle en péril (Éditions Grasset Jeunesse)
1975: Les Trèfle de Longue-Oreille. Deuxième aventure : Lançons le cerf-volant (Grasset Jeunesse)
1975: Les Trèfle de Longue-Oreille. Troisième aventure : Et hop dans le chapeau (Grasset Jeunesse)
1973: Un hiver dans la vie de Gros-Ours (Grasset Jeunesse)
1977: L'Enfant qui voulait voir la mer (Jean-Pierre Delarge éditeur, Prix des 50 plus beaux livres 1977)
1978: Oleg, le léopard des neiges (tale for children) 
1981: Oleg retrouve son royaume (tale for children)

Screenwriter 
 1984: Le Bonheur à Romorantin by Alain Dhénaut (TV)
 1992: The Supper by Édouard Molinaro  
 1996: Beaumarchais, l'insolent by Édouard Molinaro after a play by Sacha Guitry
 
Actor
  by Francis Girod

References

External links 
 Jean-Claude Brisville, une vie pour la littérature on Le Figaro (14 August 2014)
 Le Souper
 Entretiens avec Jean-Claude Brisville
 Jean-Claude Brisville on Who's Who
 Jean-Claude Brisville on L'Avant-scène théâtre
 

20th-century French male writers
20th-century French dramatists and playwrights
French screenwriters
French children's writers
French publishers (people)
1922 births
People from Bois-Colombes
2014 deaths
Chevaliers of the Légion d'honneur
Officiers of the Ordre des Arts et des Lettres
Prix Sainte-Beuve winners